The Exoplanet Data Explorer / Exoplanet Orbit Database lists extrasolar planets up to 24 Jupiter masses.

Overview 
 "We have retained the generous upper mass limit of 24 Jupiter masses in our definition of a “planet”, for the same reasons as in the Catalog: at the moment, any mass limit is arbitrary and will serve little practical function both  because of the sin i ambiguity in radial velocity masses and because of the lack of physical motivation.

 The 13 Jupiter-mass distinction by the IAU Working Group is physically unmotivated for planets with rocky cores, and observationally problematic due to the sin i ambiguity. A useful theoretical and rhetorical distinction is to segregate brown dwarfs from  planets by their formation mechanism, but such a distinction is of little utility observationally."
The database is updated to include new exoplanets and possible exoplanets, using data from other archives such as the Astrophysics Data System, ArXiv and the NASA Exoplanet Archive.

See also

Extrasolar Planets Encyclopaedia
NASA Exoplanet Archive

References

Astronomy websites
Exoplanet catalogues
Astronomical databases